Max Patch is a bald mountain on the North Carolina-Tennessee Border in Madison County, North Carolina, and Cocke County, Tennessee. It is a major landmark along the Tennessee/North Carolina section of the Appalachian Trail, although its summit is located in North Carolina. It is known for its 360-degree views of the surrounding mountains, namely the Bald Mountains in the immediate vicinity; the Unakas to the north; the Great Smoky Mountains National Park to the south; and the Great Balsams and Black Mountains to the southeast. A small parking area is located near the summit with a short loop trail. There are no public bathrooms or trash cans and parking is limited at the site.

History 

Max Patch was originally cleared in the early 19th century by farmers seeking to use the area as pasture for cattle and sheep. Throughout the first half of the 20th century, the mountain was used for a wide range of purposes including the site of an inn, a hostel circuit, and an airstrip before the United States Forest Service purchased the area in 1982 to preserve the historic site and prevent the construction of a ski resort. The Carolina Mountain Club, Appalachian Trail Conservancy, and United States Forest Service worked collaboratively to relocate the Appalachian Trail to Max Patch's summit and completed the projected in 1984.

Ecology 

In addition to being a popular tourist destination, Max Patch is home to an array of native plants and wildlife. The mountain is managed by the United States Forest Service to maintain its early ecological succession stage, preserving habitat for local flora and fauna in addition to the famed panoramic views. The Carolina Mountain Club, United States Fish and Wildlife Service, and Appalachian Trail Conservancy also work to help restore and manage the area's ecosystem. American black bears, bobcats, and elk have been spotted at Max Patch. The area is also a designated Important Bird Area through Birdlife International and a critical site for the imperiled golden-winged warbler and an assortment of other bird species. In addition, Max Patch is an important stopover point for monarch butterfly populations.

Tourism and Conservation 

Due to widespread ecological damage and human health hazards stemming from overuse and irresponsible visitor stewardship, the United States Forest Service issued a closure order to help the area recover in July 2021. The order includes a ban on overnight camping, fires, and group sizes of more than ten. The full closure order is listed below. Visitors are encouraged to leave no trace and always stay on trail in order to prevent the creation of harmful social trails which damage habitat through erosion and fragmentation. 

Mars Hill, NC, July 1, 2021—The Pisgah National Forest is implementing new restrictions at Max Patch designed to reduce impacts to natural resources and protect public health and safety. Effective immediately in the area around Max Patch as delineated on the map below, the following rules apply:

 No camping.
 No fires.
 Area closes 1 hour after sundown. Reopens 1 hour before sunrise. Visitors prohibited during closed hours.
 Group size limited to 10.
 Dogs and other animals must be on a leash no longer than 6 feet, or in a crate or cage.
 Stay on designated trails.
 Aircraft may not land nor drop off or pick up anything in this area. Drones are prohibited on Appalachian Trail.
 No fireworks.
 Bikes must stay on roads only.
 Horses and other saddle and pack animals may not be ridden, hitched, tethered, or hobbled in this area.

References

External links
Max Patch, NC

Max Patch Mountain – The Heartland Series episode

Mountains of North Carolina
Mountains of Tennessee
Mountains on the Appalachian Trail
Protected areas of Madison County, North Carolina
Protected areas of Cocke County, Tennessee
Appalachian balds
Landforms of Madison County, North Carolina
Mountains of Cocke County, Tennessee